The Western People's Front, currently named the Democratic People's Front (Prajathanthravadi Janatha Peramunay), is a political party in Sri Lanka active in the Western Province. 

WPF was originally a trade union, then converted into a political party. It draws support from the Tamil population of Colombo. Party leader Hon. Manoharan Ganesan (Mano Ganesan) (Tamil: மனோ கணேசன்) is former a Member of Parliament, elected on a United National Party ticket.

Today this party has one Provincial council seat and four Municipal council seats, and the party has grown a lot with recruiting more members and supporters.

External links
 WPF Democratic People's Front Deputy Leader's website

 
Political parties in Sri Lanka
Trade unions in Sri Lanka